The   is a Japan-based company established in 1992.  It is mainly engaged in retail business for furniture and interior household accessory items.  The company operates several brands namely “Francfranc”, “BALS Tokyo”, “Agito” and “J. Period” covering different market segments in the country.  The first retail shop,  operating under the brand “Francfranc”, is considered as the pioneer of the industry in Japan because 15 years ago in Japan there were no retail stores selling furniture together with households items such as table and kitchen-ware, fabrics, lightings, bathroom items, interior decorations and stationery in one shop.  

BALS is an acronym for Basic Artistic Life Style. The basic concept of Francfranc is “simple and stylish”.  All the furniture items are specially designed to save space to cope with the smaller size of Tokyo apartments.  More than 70 stores all over Japan in 2006.

External links
Official site

Retail companies of Japan
Companies formerly listed on the Tokyo Stock Exchange